Julio César Alcorsé (born September 17, 1981 in Santa Fe, Argentina) is a professional footballer who plays as a striker.

Playing career

He started his career when he was only 16 years old in Entella Chiavari Club (Italy). In the year 2000 he joined Boca Juniors, starting in the second team and after scoring 15 goals in only 12 games he joined the first team with Carlos Bianchi as coach. He played 3 games and then he joined a Swiss Club:  F.C Luzern (2001-2002) scoring 6 goals in 14 games. Almirante Brown (Arrecifes), Deportivo Moron, Union La Calera (Chile) and Sportivo Belgrano Cordoba in Argentina were the clubs where he played too.
In 2007, he joined a Maltese club, Hibernians FC. He won the Maltese Super Cup, played the UEFA Cup Classification in Serbia and scored 2 goals in 10 games.
After 6 months he moved on loan to another Maltese club, Marsaxlokk FC. He played in this club until 2011 (with a 2 times  - 6 months - break  that he joined Guarani FC in Paraguay and Sliema Wanderers in Malta as well) playing 45 games and scoring 37 goals.
In 2011 Indonesia was his new destination: PSM Medan first - IPL League - until 2012  and then in 2013 Persibo Bojonegoro (first round). AFC cup was another International Cup that Julio played (3 games- 2 goals.) In the second round he played for Persijap Jepara - IPL League - playing 8 games and scored 6 goals.

In March 2014 he joined PSIS Semarang, he played 17 games and scored 13 goals.

Personal life
Julio is married to Julieta Zerillo, and the couple have one daughter called Catalina Alcorse.

References
http://argentina-jca.wix.com/julio-ca

Living people
1981 births
Footballers from Santa Fe, Argentina
Argentine footballers
Boca Juniors footballers
FC Luzern players
Hibernians F.C. players
Marsaxlokk F.C. players
Club Guaraní players
Sliema Wanderers F.C. players
Deportivo Morón footballers
Unión La Calera footballers
PSMS Medan players
Persijap Jepara players
Argentine Primera División players
Expatriate footballers in Chile
Expatriate footballers in Paraguay
Expatriate footballers in Switzerland
Expatriate footballers in Malta
Argentine expatriate footballers
Association football forwards